Jourgnac is a commune in the Haute-Vienne department in the Nouvelle-Aquitaine region in west-central France.

Geography
The river Briance forms part of the commune's northern border.

Inhabitants are known as Jourgnacois.

See also
Communes of the Haute-Vienne department

References

Communes of Haute-Vienne